Joseph Kasa-Vubu, alternatively Joseph Kasavubu, ( – 24 March 1969) was a Congolese politician who served as the first President of the Democratic Republic of the Congo (then Republic of the Congo) from 1960 until 1965.

A member of the Kongo ethnic group, Kasa-Vubu became the leader of the Alliance des Bakongo (ABAKO) party in the 1950s and soon became a leading proponent of Congo's independence from Belgian colonial rule. He then became the country's first president in a coalition with Patrice Lumumba as prime minister. Less than a week after the country's independence in 1960, their government was confronted by the Congo Crisis, a series of secession movements and rebellions. During this time, Kasa-Vubu, a centrist, clashed with the leftist Lumumba when the latter ordered assistance from the Soviet Union, leading to a political deadlock. Kasa-Vubu then dissolved Lumumba's government, accusing it of having communist sympathies. Following Lumumba's execution in 1961, Kasa-Vubu presided over a series of weak governments while confronting subsequent rebellions by Lumumba's supporters. In 1965, he was overthrown in another coup by Joseph-Désiré  Mobutu and died four years later.

Early life 
Joseph Kasa-Vubu was born in the village of Kuma-Dizi in the Mayombe district in the Bas-Congo, in the west of the Belgian Congo. Different sources list his year of birth as 1910, 1913, 1915, or 1917, though 1915 is the most probable date. He was the eighth of nine children in a family of the Yombe people, an ethnic group that is a subset of the Kongo people. His father was a successful farmer who, as an independent entrepreneur, traded with street merchants in Cabinda and built his house at the outskirts of the village. This earned him the animosity of the villagers and in an attempt to assuage their hostility he volunteered to undergo a "poison test" with a substance extracted from a kasa tree. The word "Kasa" was appended onto his name in commemoration of the event. Kasa-Vubu's mother died four years after his birth, and his father died in 1936. On 31 January 1925 he was baptised under the Christian name of Joseph at the Scheutist Catholic mission of Kizu, near Tshela.

In 1927 Kasa-Vubu enrolled in primary school at the third-year level. The following year he transferred to a minor seminary in Mbata-Kiela, 50 kilometers away from Tshela. There he completed his primary studies and began learning Latin and humanities in preparation for instruction at major seminary. An industrious student, Kasa-Vubu graduated second in his class in 1936 and was admitted to the Kabwe seminary in Kasai Province. He intended to study three years of philosophy and five years of theology before becoming an ordained priest. Following the completion of the former courses in 1939 he was expelled by the bishop.

Kasa-Vubu subsequently returned to Mayombe and took up work as a bookkeeper for the Kangu mission. Dissatisfied with his salary of 80 francs per month, Kasa-Vubu passed the instructor's exam and became a sixth-grade teacher at the mission school in early 1941. However, his pay was not increased and he left the mission in open disagreement with the superior and the local bishop. In May he found a new job at Agrifor, an agricultural and logging company. With a monthly pay of 500 francs, he felt financially secure enough to marry; on 10 October Kasa-Vubu wedded Hortense Ngoma Masunda in a Catholic ceremony at the Kangu mission. They had nine children.

In June 1942 Kasa-Vubu earned a job as a clerk in the finance department of the Belgian colonial administration in Léopoldville, the capital of the Congo. He worked there for 15 years, attaining the rank of chief clerk, the highest level of employment available to Congolese civil servants under Belgian rule. In 1956 he was in charge of accounting for all of the administration's general stores.

Political activities 
Kasa-Vubu began semi-clandestine political organising work while he was still employed by colonial authorities.

Following the resignation of its leader on 21 March 1954, Kasa-Vubu was elected president of the Alliance des Bakongo (ABAKO). Under his leadership, the group swept the first open municipal Leopoldville elections in 1957 and he was elected mayor of the Dendale district of the city.

Kasa-Vubu quickly became known as one of the first Congolese leaders to call for independence. At first, he advocated for independence from Belgium on a 30-year timeline, but he shortened the timetable as the ABAKO movement gained in strength. In his inauguration speech as mayor of Dendale, Kasa-Vubu reiterated his demand for independence, drawing a reprimand from Belgian colonial authorities, which only strengthened his image as a Congolese leader.

On 4 January 1959, an ABAKO political gathering organised by Kasa-Vubu erupted into violence, sparking the Léopoldville riots, a pivotal moment in the Congolese struggle for independence. Kasa-Vubu was set to address the crowd on African nationalism, but colonial authorities banned the meeting. They were unable to calm the crowd and thousands of Congolese began rioting. Kasa-Vubu was arrested, along with several other leaders, and imprisoned for inciting the riot. He was released two months later.

Presidency 

Upon Congo's independence from Belgium, the ABAKO won a significant number of votes in the new parliament but not an outright victory. In a political compromise, it was agreed that Patrice Lumumba, of the Mouvement National Congolais (MNC) would be prime minister, and Kasa-Vubu would face Jean Bolikango, a former mentor in the ABAKO, for the presidency. The election of Kasa-Vubu brought about wide-ranging acceptance of the Congo's new administration. The Belgian press reacted positively to the development, while the Léopoldville's daily newspaper Courrier d'Afrique, edited by a Kongo, showed much warmer approval of the government. International opinion expressed satisfaction at the striking of a proper balance in leadership. Belgian politicians hoped that Kasa-Vubu would check Lumumba's impulses and personal disdain for Belgium. He was officially sworn in as president on 27 June.

The new republic was immediately disrupted by political and military strife and regional secessionist movements, and the central government was paralyzed by conflict between the conservative Kasa-Vubu and leftist Prime Minister Lumumba. While Lumumba advocated for a stronger central government, Kasa-Vubu preferred a more decentralized form of government that gave autonomous powers to provinces under a federal system.

Kasa-Vubu was regarded as rather mysterious in his motivations and his actions, frequently preferring to stay silent or give ambiguous answers when he was confronted. His role as head-of-state was theoretically ceremonial and far less influential than Lumumba's role as prime minister. During the immediate upheaval following independence, Kasa-Vubu took few steps and made few definitive statements, even as Lumumba appealed for international assistance to the Americans, the United Nations and the Soviet Union. Meanwhile, Kasa-Vubu faced criticism from ABAKO and President Fulbert Youlou of Congo-Brazzaville for not curbing Lumumba's authoritarian actions. He resisted their pressure, and on 13 August he broadcast an appeal for unity and support for the government. Nevertheless, he cautioned the government against arbitrariness and excess:
If I am under a moral obligation to support and defend the government within the limits set by the law, the members of the government themselves have a duty to work together as a team. Their policy must be the policy of the government and not that of one party, one race, or one tribe. It must be a policy which reflects the interests of the nation and which allows humanitarian values to flourish in freedom. This imperative excludes all feelings of hatred, suspicion, and bad faith towards those who have collaborated loyally with us. It is also the duty of the government to respect the institutions which have been set up and to abide by the normal rules of democratic practice.

On 5 September, Kasa-Vubu dissolved Lumumba's government which he accused of communist sympathies. Lumumba refused to accept his dismissal and announced Kasa-Vubu's dismissal, creating a stalemate that endured until 14 September, when Army Commander Joseph-Désiré Mobutu seized power and arrested Lumumba. Lumumba was later handed to Moïse Tshombe's secessionist state in Katanga and was murdered under an alleged association of Mobutu, Kasa-Vubu, Moise Tshombe and the western powers, who had interests in the natural resources in Congo.

Over the next five years, Kasa-Vubu presided over a succession of weak governments. After the end of the secession of Katanga, Kasa-Vubu appointed Tshombe as prime minister in July 1964 with a mandate to end the emerging Simba Rebellion. Tshombe recalled the exiled Katangese Gendarmerie and recruited white mercenaries, integrating them with the Armée Nationale Congolaise (ANC). Many of the mercenaries had fought for Katanga while Tshombe was the leader of that breakaway province. Despite the successes against the Simba rebels, Tshombe's prestige was damaged by his use of white mercenaries and western forces. He lost the support of Kasa-Vubu, who dismissed him from the post of prime minister, in October 1965.

Mobutu seized power for a second time on 25 November 1965, now deposing Kasa-Vubu and subsequently declaring himself head of state.

Death 
Mobutu placed Kasa-Vubu under house arrest before eventually allowing the deposed president to retire to his farm in Mayombe. Kasa-Vubu died in a hospital in Boma four years later in 1969, possibly after a long illness.

Legacy 
Kasa-Vubu's family went into exile following his death, first to Algeria and then Switzerland. One of his daughters, Justine M'Poyo Kasa-Vubu, eventually returned to the Congo (then called Zaire) in the 1990s. In 1997, she was appointed a cabinet minister by Laurent Kabila and then ambassador to Belgium. A bust of Kasa-Vubu's visage was erected on his tomb in September 2002 at the urging of his supporters.

Kasa-Vubu's role in Congolese history has been overshadowed in literature by Lumumba and Mobutu. Anthropologist Yolanda Covington-Ward wrote that, contrary to Lumumba's "privileged" position in historiography on Congolese nationalism, Kasa-Vubu and ABAKO were the primary "driving force" behind the independence movement.

Honours 
 Grand Cordon in the Order of Leopold, by King Baudouin 30th june 1960.
 Instituted and recognized as National Hero of the Democratic Republic of Congo on June 30, 2020

In popular culture
In the 2000 film Lumumba, Kasa-Vubu was played by Maka Kotto.

Notes

References

Sources

Further reading

1910s births
1969 deaths
Democratic Republic of the Congo anti-communists
Democratic Republic of the Congo nationalists
Democratic Republic of the Congo Roman Catholics
Évolués
Kongo people
Leaders ousted by a coup
People from Kongo Central
People of the Congo Crisis
Presidents of the Democratic Republic of the Congo